Planta may refer to:

Places 
Planta, Suwałki County, Podlaskie Voivodeship, Poland
Planta, Hajnówka County, Podlaskie Voivodeship, Poland
Planta, Lublin Voivodeship, Poland
Planta, Świętokrzyskie Voivodeship, Poland

People

Other 
Battle on the Planta, fought in November 1475 as part of the Burgundian Wars
Planta Margarine, the first margarine to be imported into Malaysia in 1930
Planta (journal), a journal of plant biology
Planta (album), an album by CSS
"Planta" (song), a 1995 song by Soda Stereo